Michael Alan Gothard (24 June 19392 December 1992) was an English actor, who portrayed Kai in the television series Arthur of the Britons and the mysterious villain Emile Leopold Locque in the 1981 James Bond film For Your Eyes Only.

Early life
Michael Gothard was born in London in 1939. As a child, he lived in both Wales and London. After leaving Haverstock School, he travelled in France for several months before returning home. He went through various jobs, including being a building labourer and a trainee reporter.  He even had a brief spell as a clothes model, but he never felt comfortable doing that job. He said: "I was as stiff as a board and I couldn’t overcome my sense of the ridiculous. I was a clothes hanger, an object, not a person."

Career
He joined the New Arts Theatre as a scenery mover, and became part of an amateur film a friend was making. After landing the lead role, he was encouraged to take up the profession. He attended evening classes at an actors' workshop whilst holding down a day job. He was involved working in some of the first "Lunchtime theatre" productions in the 1960s, from pub cellars to top floor spaces off St. Martin's Lane. His first television role was in an episode of Out of the Unknown in 1966 called "The Machine Stops". He was then cast in Don Levy's film Herostratus in 1967 and Up the Junction in 1968. He then acquired a female following after taking a role as the villainous Mordaunt in the BBC's adaptation of Twenty Years After (Further Adventures of the Musketeers).

His performance as the nightclubbing killer Keith in Scream and Scream Again, directed by Gordon Hessler, was a break-out role for him, giving him exposure and leading to other, more prominent parts. In the film, Keith makes one of the most memorable escapes (in an Austin-Healey car) from the police ever seen. The film's main stars were Vincent Price, Peter Cushing and Christopher Lee. Executive producer Louis M. Heyward said of Gothard's performance: "I felt that Michael Gothard was going to be the biggest thing that ever happened. He had that insane look and that drive, and he was wonderful. Here is a kid who really threw himself into the picture wholeheartedly. Do you remember the scene where he appears to be walking up the cliff? That's a stunt that, as an actor, I would not have agreed to; I’d say, 'Hey, get a double or get a dummy. I ain't either one.' But the kid agreed to do it, without a double—he was that driven. He had a lot of class and a lot of style. Gordon (Hessler) came up with the idea of using an overhead cable to give that illusion of his walking up the cliff."

He appeared in Ken Russell's 1971 horror film, The Devils, in which Gothard had a stand-out role as a fanatic witch-hunter and exorcist who defiles Vanessa Redgrave and tortures Oliver Reed. His performance as a young disillusioned hippie in Barbet Schroeder's La Vallée (1972) contrasted with the rest of his career. He also played a fictionalised version of the 17th century assassin John Felton in Richard Lester's 1973 film of The Three Musketeers and its 1974 sequel, The Four Musketeers.

He had a regular role as Kai opposite Oliver Tobias's King Arthur on the aforementioned Arthur of the Britons during the early 1970s. He became known to a wider cinema audience for his menacing turn as the villainous (and non-speaking) Belgian henchman, Emile Leopold Locque, in the 1981 James Bond film, For Your Eyes Only. Gothard was actually the one who suggested Locque's signature octagonal glasses in an effort to make the character more menacing. His later appearances included supporting roles in Tobe Hooper's 1985 science-fiction horror extravaganza, Lifeforce, and as George Lusk in the 1988 TV movie, Jack the Ripper, with Michael Caine. He appeared with Dean Stockwell and Shirley Knight in a Hammer House of Mystery and Suspense (a.k.a. Fox Mystery Theatre) episode, The Sweet Scent of Death. 

One of his last main appearances was 
in 1992s Christopher Columbus: The Discovery.

His final role was in David Wickes's Frankenstein, starring Patrick Bergin and Randy Quaid.

Death
Gothard, who struggled with depression for much of his life, committed suicide by hanging on 2 December 1992. He was 53 years old.

Filmography

Film
Herostratus (1967) as Max
Up the Junction (1968) as Terry
Michael Kohlhaas-Der Rebell (1969) as John
Scream and Scream Again (1970) as Keith
The Last Valley (1971) as Hansen
The Devils (1971) as Father Barre
Whoever Slew Auntie Roo? (1971) as Albie
La Vallée (1972) as Olivier
The Three Musketeers (1973) as John Felton
The Four Musketeers (1974) as John Felton
King Arthur, the Young Warlord (1975) as Kai
Warlords of Atlantis (1978) as Atmir
For Your Eyes Only (1981) as Emile Leopold Locque
Lifeforce (1985) as Dr Bukovsky
Going Undercover (1988) (aka Yellow Pages) as Strett
Gioco al massacro (1989) as Zabo
Destroying Angel (1990) as "the Hitman"
The Serpent of Death (1990) as Xaros
Christopher Columbus: The Discovery (1992) as Inquisitor's Spy
Frankenstein (1992) as Boatswain (final film role)

Television
Out of the Unknown (1966) as Kuno
Thirty-Minute Theatre (1966) as Grady, in "The Excavation"
The Further Adventures of the Three Musketeers (1967) as Mordaunt
Armchair Theatre (1969) as Brian, in "The Story-Teller"
Fraud Squad (1969) as Jacky Joyce, in "Run For Your Money"
Department S (1969) as Weber, in "Les Fleurs du Mal"
Randall and Hopkirk (1970) as Perrin, in "When the Spirit Moves You"
Paul Temple (1970) as Ivan, in "Games People Play"
Menace (1970) as Pip, in "Nine Bean Rows"
Arthur of the Britons (1972–1973) as Kai
Warrior Queen (1978) as Volthan
The Professionals (1979) as Kodai, in "Stopover"
A Tale of Two Cities (1980) (Michael E. Briant version) as Gaspard
Shoestring (1981) as Harry, in "The Mayfly Dance"
ITV Playhouse (1981) as Dieter, in "The Perfect House"
Ivanhoe (1982) as Athelstane
Hammer House of Mystery and Suspense (1984) as Terry Marvin, in "The Sweet Scent of Death"
Scarecrow and Mrs. King (1984) as Karl Portillo, in "Our Man in Tegernsee"
Lytton's Diary (1985) as Jake Cutler, in "Daddy's Girls"
Minder (1985) as Sergei, in "From Fulham, With Love"
Jack the Ripper (1988) as George Lusk
Capital City (1989) as Stefan in "Twelve Degrees Capricorn"

References

External links

 
 Michael Gothard Archive - an oral history and personal photographs submitted by friends and colleagues

1939 births
1992 deaths
English male film actors
English male television actors
Suicides by hanging in England
Suicides in Hampstead
Male actors from London
People with mood disorders
20th-century English male actors
1992 suicides